Anonidium is a genus of plant in family Annonaceae. 

, Plants of the World Online accepts the following species:
 Anonidium floribundum Pellegr. 
 Anonidium mannii Engl. & Diels - junglesop
 Anonidium usambarense R.E. Fries

References

Annonaceae
Annonaceae genera
Taxonomy articles created by Polbot